The Ranger Engines Division (also Ranger Aircraft Engine Division) of the Fairchild Engine & Aircraft Corporation was an American aircraft engine company. It was known as the Fairchild Engine Division after World War II.

History
The Fairchild-Caminez Engine Corporation was founded in 1925 to produce Harold Caminez's 447 engine. In 1928, it constructed a factory in Farmingdale, New York. The American Airplane & Engine Corporation was founded by the Aviation Corporation in 1931 to continue manufacturing of Ranger engines.

Products

See also
 List of aircraft engines

References

Notes

Bibliography

External links

 Fairchild (Ranger) – Aircraft Engine Historical Society

Manufacturing companies established in 1888
Companies based in Lycoming County, Pennsylvania
Defunct aircraft engine manufacturers of the United States
1888 establishments in Pennsylvania